Ampurias may refer to the following places and jurisdictions :

 Empúries (from Greek Emporion), a Mediterranean city in Catalonia, Spain
 a former port town and bishopric on Sardinia, Italy, which was gradually abandoned and saw its functions and cathedral transferred to Castelsardo (then called Castelgenovese)